The 2011 FIA European Touring Car Cup was the seventh running of the FIA European Touring Car Cup. It was contested over a single event at the Salzburgring on the weekend of 23–24 July, unlike in 2010 where it was a three-event series. The event consisted of two races run over a distance of approximately 50 kilometres each. Three FIA cups were awarded at the conclusion of the event, one per each of the eligible categories: Super 2000, Super 1600 and Super Production.

Teams and drivers

Final standings

External links
Official website of the FIA European Touring Car Cup

European Touring Car Cup
European Touring Car Cup
2011 in European sport